Nathalie Weinzierl (born 8 April 1994) is a German figure skater. She is a two-time German national champion (2014, 2017) and has won eleven senior international medals, including gold at the Bavarian Open, Dragon Trophy, and Egna Trophy, and Merano Cup. She has placed as high as 7th at the European Championships and competed at the 2014 Winter Olympics in Sochi.

Personal life 
Nathalie Weinzierl was born in Saarbrücken, Germany. She trained in alpine racing at SC Frankenthal from 1999–2005.

Skating career

Early career 
Weinzierl began training in figure skating in 2001 at Mannheim MERC, coached by Günter Zöller from 2002. She won the German bronze medal on the novice level in 2006, silver on the youth level in 2007, and silver as a junior in 2008. She began competing on the national senior level in the 2008–2009 season, placing 13th in her debut. She changed coaches in August 2009, joining Karin Stephan.

In the 2009–2010 season, Weinzierl debuted on the Junior Grand Prix series, placing 24th and 28th in her two events. Toward the end of the season, she made her first appearance on the international senior level, finishing 5th at the 2010 Triglav Trophy. Peter Sczypa became her coach in August 2011.

2011–2012 season 
Weinzierl competed with a broken blade in the free skate at the 2012 German Championships. She was assigned to her first ISU Championships, the 2012 European Championships, where she finished 22nd. She then won her first senior international medal, gold, at the 2012 Bavarian Open. She withdrew from the 2012 Coupe du Printemps.

2012–2013 season 
Weinzierl returned to the JGP series, finishing 9th and 10th in her two events, and then won her first senior national medal, silver, at the 2013 German Championships. After placing 9th in her second Europeans, she competed at the 2013 World Junior Championships, finishing 10th. Weinzierl was also assigned to her first senior World Championships and placed 19th.

2013–2014 season: Sochi Olympics 
Weinzierl took gold at the Merano Cup and bronze at the Cup of Nice before winning her first senior national title at the 2014 German Championships. She competed at the Europeans, finishing 8th. Weinzierl was selected to represent Germany at the Winter Olympics, held in February 2014 in Sochi, Russia. Ranked 10th in the short program and 21st in the free skate, she finished 18th overall in the ladies' event. In March, she placed 12th at the 2014 World Championships in Saitama, Japan.

2014–2015 season 
Weinzierl missed the first half of the season due to a back injury. She withdrew from both her Grand Prix assignments. Weinzierl competed at two Challenger events, placing 5th at Lombardia Trophy and 7th at Ondrej Nepela Trophy. She won the silver medal at the German Championships behind Nicole Schott. At the 2015 European Championships in Stockholm, Sweden, she placed 12th.

2015–2016 season 
Weinzierl started her season with a 9th place at the 2015 Nebelhorn Trophy. She competed at two additional Challenger events, placing 10th at Ice Challenge and 6th at Tallinn Trophy. She won her third silver medal from the German Championships, this time behind Lutricia Bock. At the 2016 European Championships in Bratislava, Slovakia, Weinzierl placed 7th in both segments and overall. She did not qualify to the free skate at the 2016 World Championships in Boston, placing 35th in the short program.

Programs

Competitive highlights 
GP: Grand Prix; CS: Challenger Series; JGP: Junior Grand Prix

Seasons: 2009–10 to present

Seasons: 2005–2006 to 2008–2009

References

External links 

 
 Official website of Nathalie Weinzierl
 Nathalie Weinzierl at The Figure Skating Corner
 Nathalie Weinzierl at Tracings.net

1994 births
Living people
German female single skaters
Sportspeople from Saarbrücken
Figure skaters at the 2014 Winter Olympics
Olympic figure skaters of Germany
Competitors at the 2015 Winter Universiade